Lovelady High School is a high school located in Lovelady, Texas

Athletics
The Lovelady Lions compete in the following sports - 

Cross Country, Volleyball, Football, Basketball, Baseball, Softball, and Track

Notable alumni
Homer Rainey (January 19, 1896 - December 19, 1985): Former University of Texas president (1939-1944), 1913 graduate of Lovelady High School.
Charles Harrelson, hitman and father of Woody Harrelson, briefly attended Lovelady High school, before transferring to Huntsville where he dropped out.
Paul Wakefield-General, journalist, political aide (most notably, Vice President John Nance Garner).
 Myrtle Mainer Neff- First Lady of Texas

References

Buildings and structures in Houston County, Texas
Schools in Houston County, Texas
Educational institutions in the United States with year of establishment missing
Public high schools in Texas